The Algerian Handball Cup is an elimination handball tournament held annually in Algeria. It is the second most important national title in Algerian handball after the Algerian Handball Championship.  It started in 1962.

Winners 

 Rq:
MC Alger: ex. MP Alger & GS Pétroliers
OC Alger: ex. CS DNC Alger & IRB Alger
RC Kouba: ex. CSS Kouba & NAR Alger
MC Oran: ex. MP Oran
CR Belouizdad: ex. CR Belcourt
Hamra Annaba: ex. USM Annaba

Performance by club

See also 
 Algerian Handball Championship

External links 
 FAHB official website
 1st Algerian handball website - dzhand.net

Handball in Algeria
Handball competitions in Algeria